Mezzo forte may refer to:

 Mezzo forte (musical notation), a dynamic level in musical notation
 Mezzo Forte, an anime series
 Mezzoforte (band), an Icelandic instrumental jazz-funk fusion group
 Mezzoforte (album), their 1979 debut album

See also
 Requiem – Mezzo Forte, an album by Virgin Black

gl:Mezzoforte
ja:メッゾ・フォルテ